This article describes the knockout stage of the 2017–18 EHF Champions League.

Qualified teams
The top six placed teams from each of the two groups advanced to the knockout stage.

Format
12 teams played home and away in the first knock-out phase, with the 10 teams qualified from groups A and B and the two teams qualified from groups C and D. After that, the six winners of these matches in the first knock-out phase joined the winners of groups A and B to play home and away for the right to play in the final four.

Round of 16

Overview

|}
Notes

Matches

Montpellier won 56–55 on aggregate.

Skjern Håndbold won 61–59 on aggregate.

HBC Nantes won 60–52 on aggregate.

Flensburg-Handewitt won 53–46 on aggregate.

PGE Vive Kielce won 77–47 on aggregate.

THW Kiel won 56–50 on aggregate.

Quarterfinals

Overview

|}

Matches

Vardar won 56–56 on aggregate on away goals.

Paris Saint-Germain won 69–60 on aggregate.

Montpellier won 57–45 on aggregate.

HBC Nantes won 60–54 on aggregate.

Final four
The final four was held at the Lanxess Arena in Cologne, Germany on 26 and 27 May 2018. The draw was held on 2 May 2018.

Bracket

Semifinals

Third place game

Final

References

External links
Final four website

knockout stage